Muse is a children's magazine published by Carus Publishing, the publishers of Cricket. Launched in January 1997, it is published in Chicago, Illinois, and has readers throughout the United States and around the world. From 1997 to today, it was published by Cricket and sponsored by Smithsonian. Recommended for ages nine and above, it features articles about science, history, and the arts.  It is edited by Johanna Arnone. Nine cartoon characters, known as the Muses, used to appear in the margins throughout the magazine as well as in the Kokopelli & Company comic strip. After merging with its sister magazine Odyssey in September 2015, Muse added new content, changed its layout, and replaced the Muses with a comic named "Parallel U" featuring different characters.

Magazine contents
Muse is published nine times annually. Each issue contains a comic strip ("Parallel U") written by Caanan Grall, letters from readers (Muse Mail), a facts page (Muse News), a contest, a question-and-answer page written by Lizzie Wade, a page about technology, and articles on various topics. Past issues have included articles about vegetarianism, pie throwing, extraterrestrial life, naked mole-rats, the origin of the moon, pirates, urban legends, insects, mummies, tenrecs, the history of napkins, contacting ghosts, New Zealand's exploding trousers, Rube Goldberg inventions, The Lord of the Rings, and blind cavefish.

Muses
The Muses were drawn by cartoonist Larry Gonick. Among them, only Urania was one of the original Greek muses; Kokopelli, a trickster, is a god in many Native American tribes.
 Kokopelli: Muse of tunes and tricks, who often throws pies
 Chad: Muse of Hardware
 Aeiou: Muse of Software
 Bo: Muse of Factoids
 Urania: Muse of Astronomy
 Feather: Muse of Plants
 Crraw: Muse of Bad Poetry
 Pwt: Muse of Animals
 Mimi: Muse of getting along with people

In addition, Devil, Kokopelli's dog, and Angel, Mimi's cat, were occasionally featured, more so in older issues.

As of September 2015, the Muses have been removed from the magazine, replaced with a new comic called Parallel U drawn by Caanan Grall.

Awards
2019 Parents’ Choice Gold
2018 Parents’ Choice Gold
2017 Parents’ Choice Gold
2016 Parents' Choice Gold
2015 Parents' Choice Gold
2014 Parents' Choice Gold
2013 Parents' Choice Gold
2012 Parents' Choice Gold
2010 Parents' Choice Gold
2008 Parents' Choice Silver
2005 Parents' Choice Gold

References

External links
Cricket Media (Muse's official website)

1997 establishments in Illinois
Advertising-free magazines
Children's magazines published in the United States
Magazines established in 1997
Magazines published in Chicago
Nine times annually magazines